Anytime, Anyplace, Anywhere is the first studio album by the Rossington Collins Band.  It includes their most successful single, "Don't Misunderstand Me".
It was recorded at (the now defunct) El Adobe Studios in El Paso, Texas.

Track listing
"Prime Time" (Collins, Rossington, Krantz) – 4:06
"Three Times as Bad" (Collins, Krantz) – 6:04
"Don't Misunderstand Me" (Collins, Harwood, Krantz) – 3:58
"One Good Man" (Collins, Rossington, Krantz) – 4:40
"Opportunity" (Powell, Harwood, Krantz) – 4:34
"Getaway" (Powell, Krantz, Harwood) – 7:26
"Winners and Losers" (Rossington, Collins) – 5:10
"Misery Loves Company" (Rossington, Krantz) – 4:49
"Sometimes You Can Put It Out" (Harwood, Krantz, Rossington) – 5:44

Personnel
Allen Collins - lead & rhythm guitars
Barry Lee Harwood - lead & rhythm guitars, slide guitar, vocals
Derek Hess - drums, percussion
Dale Krantz - lead vocals
Billy Powell - keyboards
Gary Rossington - lead & rhythm guitars, slide guitar
Leon Wilkeson - bass guitar
Howard Steele - engineer, mixer
Dave Evans - mixer

References

1980 debut albums